Alcide Vaucher (born 19 April 1934) is a Swiss racing cyclist. He rode in the 1957 Tour de France.

References

External links
 

1934 births
Living people
Swiss male cyclists
Place of birth missing (living people)
Tour de Suisse stage winners